Kidane Mihret is a river of the Nile basin. Rising in the mountains of Dogu’a Tembien in northern Ethiopia, it flows northward to empty finally in Weri’i and Tekezé River.

Characteristics 
It is a confined bedrock river, with an average slope gradient of 102 metres per kilometre. With its tributaries, the river has cut a deep gorge.

Flash floods and flood buffering
Runoff mostly happens in the form of high runoff discharge events that occur in a very short period (called flash floods). These are related to the steep topography, often little vegetation cover and intense convective rainfall. The peaks of such flash floods have often a 50 to 100 times larger discharge than the preceding baseflow.
The magnitude of floods in to a certain extent buffered by the presence of the large Awhi Dur forest in its catchment. Also, exclosures have been established; the dense vegetation largely contributes to enhanced infiltration, less flooding and better baseflow. Physical conservation structures such as stone bunds and check dams also intercept runoff.

Transhumance towards the gorge
Transhumance takes place in the summer rainy season, when the lands near the villages are occupied by crops. Young shepherds will take the village cattle down to the lower valley and overnight in small caves. The valley bottom is particularly attractive as a transhumance destination zone, because there is water and good growth of semi-natural vegetation.

Boulders and pebbles in the river bed
Boulders and pebbles encountered in the river bed can originate from any location higher up in the catchment. In the uppermost stretches of the river, only rock fragments of the upper lithological units will be present in the river bed, whereas more downstream one may find a more comprehensive mix of all lithologies crossed by the river. From upstream to downstream, the following lithological units occur in the catchment.
 Upper basalt
 Interbedded lacustrine deposits
 Lower basalt
 Amba Aradam Formation
 Antalo Limestone
 Adigrat Sandstone

Trekking along the river
Trekking routes have been established across and along this river. The tracks are not marked on the ground but can be followed using downloaded .GPX files.
 Trek 3, along Tsaliet, near the outlet of Kidane Mihret
 Trek 4, across the upper catchment in Waseiya village
In the rainy season, flash floods may occur and it is advised not to follow the river bed. At times it may be impossible to cross the river in the rainy season.

See also 
 List of Ethiopian rivers

References

Rivers of Ethiopia
Dogu'a Tembien
Tigray Region
Nile basin